HD 114729 b is an extrasolar planet approximately 114 light years away in the constellation of Centaurus. This planet is probably slightly less massive than Jupiter. It is an "eccentric Jupiter" meaning that it does not orbit very near the star like the famous 51 Pegasi b but further out and its orbit is very oval-shaped. The mean distance from the star is 2.11 AU, about twice the Earth's distance from the Sun. At periastron, the planet is only 1.43 AU from the star (comparable to the distance of Mars from the Sun), and at apoastron, the orbital distance is 2.72 AU (inner asteroid belt).

References

External links 
 

Centaurus (constellation)
Exoplanets discovered in 2003
Giant planets
Exoplanets detected by radial velocity